Alma Wash is an arroyo located in the U.S. state of California. It is located in San Diego County.

References

Washes of California